27J Schools is a school district headquartered in Brighton, Colorado. The district was established in 1959 when several existing school districts were consolidated. Dr. Chris Fiedler is currently the superintendent.

The district includes sections of Adams County, Weld County, and Broomfield. In addition to Brighton it serves Aurora, Commerce City, Henderson, and Thornton. 

In August 2018 the district switched a four-day school week. In that period the district had around 18,000 students.

Schools

Elementary:
Brantner Elementary
Henderson Elementary
North Elementary
Northeast Elementary
Mary E. Pennock Elementary
Reunion Elementary
Second Creek Elementary
South Elementary
Southeast Elementary
Southlawn Elementary
Thimmig Elementary
Turnberry Elementary
West Ridge Elementary

Middle:
Overland Middle School
Prairie View Middle School
Quist Middle School
Otho E. Stuart Middle School
Vikan Middle School 

High:
 Brighton High School
 Prairie View High School
 Riverdale Ridge High School

Alternative:
Brighton Heritage Academy
B.O.L.T. (Brighton Online Learning for Tomorrow) Academy

Charter:
Bromley East Charter school
Belle Creek Charter School
Eagle Ridge Academy High School
Landmark Academy
Foundations Academy

References

External links
 Official site (Mobile)

School districts in Colorado
Education in Adams County, Colorado
Education in Broomfield, Colorado
Education in Weld County, Colorado